In linguistics, the autonomy of syntax is the assumption that  syntax is arbitrary and self-contained with respect to meaning, semantics, pragmatics, discourse function, and other factors external to language. The autonomy of syntax is advocated by linguistic formalists, and in particular by generative linguistics, whose approaches have hence been called autonomist linguistics. 

The autonomy of syntax is at the center of the debates between formalist and functionalist linguistics, and since the 1980s research has been conducted on the syntax–semantics interface within functionalist approaches, aimed at finding instances of semantically determined syntactic structures, to disprove the formalist argument of the autonomy of syntax.

The principle of iconicity is contrasted, for some scenarios, with that of the autonomy of syntax. The weaker version of the argument for the autonomy of syntax (or that for the autonomy of grammar), includes only for the principle of arbitrariness, while the stronger version includes the claim of self-containedness. The principle of arbitrariedness of syntax is actually accepted by most functionalist linguist, and the real dispute between functionalist and generativists is on the claim of self-containedness of grammar or syntax.

History 
The assumption of the autonomy of syntax can be traced back to the neglect of the study of semantics by American structuralists like Leonard Bloomfield and Zellig Harris in the 1940s, which was based on a neo-positivist anti-psychologist stance, according to which since it's presumably impossible to study how the brain works, linguists should ignore all cognitive and  psychological aspects of language and focus on the only objective data, that is how language appears in its exterior form. This paralleled the distinction between the two approaches in psychology, behaviorism, which was the dominant approach up until the 1940s, and cognitivism.

Over the decades, multiple instances have been found of cases in which syntactic structures are actually determined or influenced by semantic traits, and some formalists and generativists have reacted to that by shrinking those parts of semantics that they consider autonomous. Over the decades, in the changes that Noam Chomsky has made to his generative formulation, there has been a shift from a claim for the autonomy of syntax to one for the autonomy of grammar.

See also 
 Linguistic wars
 Grammaticalization
 Self-contained system (software)

Notes and references 

Linguistic theories and hypotheses
Generative linguistics
Semantics
Syntax
Philosophy of language
Syntax–semantics interface